Cornovecchio is a comune (municipality) in the Province of Lodi in the Italian region Lombardy, located about  southeast of Milan and about  southeast of Lodi.

Cornovecchio borders the following municipalities: Pizzighettone, Maleo, Crotta d'Adda, Meleti, Corno Giovine, Caselle Landi.

References

Cities and towns in Lombardy